Andrew Robert Dallas (born 22 July 1999) is a Scottish footballer who plays as a forward for Chesterfield FC

He came through the youth academy at Scottish Premiership side Rangers but failed to make a first team appearance, spending time on loan with Stenhousemuir and Greenock Morton. In 2019 he signed for Cambridge United, but went on to make his mark in a loan spell with National League side Weymouth, where he scored 12 goals in 25 appearances. In 2021 he joined Solihull Moors where he was part of the team that lost the 2022 National League play-off Final.

Career

Rangers 
Dallas signed a professional contract with Rangers in June 2016, but had been within the club's youth system for several years.

Dallas joined Scottish League Two club Stenhousemuir on loan from Rangers in March 2018 and made his professional debut on 7 April, scoring twice in a 1–4 win over Edinburgh City. Dallas went on to help Stenhousemuir gain promotion to League 1.

Having returned to Rangers and appeared on the bench in some matchday squads without making a debut for the Glasgow club, on 21 January 2019 Dallas joined Scottish Championship side Greenock Morton on a loan deal until the end of the season.

Cambridge United 
On 29 July 2019, Dallas signed for League Two club Cambridge United on a two-year deal for an undisclosed fee.

On 23 January 2021, Dallas joined National League side Weymouth on an initial one-month loan. On 17 February 2021, the loan was extended to the end of April 2021.

After scoring 12 goals in the National League with Weymouth on loan in the second half of the previous season, Dallas signed a new one-year deal with Cambridge United on 17 July 2021.

Solihull Moors 
On 13 August 2021, Dallas signed for National League side Solihull Moors for an undisclosed fee, agreeing a two-year contract. On 22 January 2022, Dallas scored all five goals as Solihull defeated bottom side Dover Athletic 5–0. Dallas was awarded the National League Player of the Month award for January 2022 after ten goals in just four matches in all competitions.

Dallas played in the 2022 National League play-off Final as Solihull were defeated 2–1 by Grimsby Town at the London Stadium missing the opportunity to earn promotion to the Football League.

Career statistics

References

External links

1999 births
Living people
Scottish footballers
Rangers F.C. players
Greenock Morton F.C. players
Stenhousemuir F.C. players
Scottish Professional Football League players
Association football forwards
Cambridge United F.C. players
Weymouth F.C. players
Solihull Moors F.C. players
English Football League players
National League (English football) players